Lignyodes is a genus of ash seed weevils in the family Curculionidae. There are at least 18 described species in Lignyodes.

Species
 Lignyodes adamanteus (Clark, 1980)
 Lignyodes arizonensis
 Lignyodes arizonicus (Sleeper, 1954)
 Lignyodes auratus Clark, 1980
 Lignyodes autumnalis (Clark, 1981) (fall forestiera weevil)
 Lignyodes baboquivariensis (Sleeper, 1954)
 Lignyodes bischoffi (Blatchley, 1916)
 Lignyodes fraxini (LeConte, 1876)
 Lignyodes graphicus (Casey, 1892)
 Lignyodes helvolus (LeConte, 1876)
 Lignyodes horridulus (Casey, 1892) (ash seed weevil)
 Lignyodes ligustricolus (Clark, 1980)
 Lignyodes ocularis (Casey, 1910)
 Lignyodes olearis Clark, 1980
 Lignyodes pallidus (LeConte, 1876)
 Lignyodes schwarzi (Pierce, 1912)
 Lignyodes transversus (Clark, 1980)
 Lignyodes varius (LeConte, 1876)

References

 Alonso-Zarazaga, Miguel A., and Christopher H. C. Lyal (1999). A World Catalogue of Families and Genera of Curculionoidea (Insecta: Coleoptera) (Excepting Scotylidae and Platypodidae), 315.
 Poole, Robert W., and Patricia Gentili, eds. (1996). "Coleoptera". Nomina Insecta Nearctica: A Check List of the Insects of North America, vol. 1: Coleoptera, Strepsiptera, 41-820.

Further reading

 Arnett, R. H. Jr., M. C. Thomas, P. E. Skelley and J. H. Frank. (eds.). (21 June 2002). American Beetles, Volume II: Polyphaga: Scarabaeoidea through Curculionoidea. CRC Press LLC, Boca Raton, Florida .
 Arnett, Ross H. (2000). American Insects: A Handbook of the Insects of America North of Mexico. CRC Press.
 Richard E. White. (1983). Peterson Field Guides: Beetles. Houghton Mifflin Company.

External links

 NCBI Taxonomy Browser, Lignyodes

Curculioninae